Cormainville is a commune in the Eure-et-Loir department in northern France.

Population

Economy

In 2006, the largest wind farm, at that time, was installed by the Volkswind company.
It consists of 30 Vestas V80-2MW wind turbines with a combined nameplate capacity of 60 MW.

See also
Communes of the Eure-et-Loir department

References

Communes of Eure-et-Loir